Caoimhe Perdue (born 4 May 2000) is a field hockey player from Ireland.

Personal life
Caoimhe Perdue was born and raised in Cashel, County Tipperary.

She is currently a student at University College Cork, where she studies Nutritional Sciences.

Career

Under–21
Perdue made her debut for the Ireland U–21 team in 2019 at the EuroHockey Junior Championship in Valencia.

In 2022 she captained the team at the FIH Junior World Cup in Potchefstroom.

National team
Following her successful career in the junior squad, Perdue was named in the national team for the 2022 FIH World Cup in Terrassa and Amsterdam.

References

External links

2000 births
Living people
Irish female field hockey players
Female field hockey defenders